Daniel Ray Coats (born May 16, 1943) is an American politician, attorney, and diplomat. From 2017 to 2019, he served as the Director of National Intelligence in the Trump administration. A member of the Republican Party, he served as a United States Senator from Indiana from 1989 to 1999 and again from 2011 to 2017. He was the United States Ambassador to Germany from 2001 to 2005, and a member of the United States House of Representatives from 1981 to 1989. Coats served on the United States Senate Select Committee on Intelligence while in the U.S. Senate.

Born in Jackson, Michigan, Coats graduated from Wheaton College in Illinois and the Indiana University School of Law – Indianapolis. He served in the U.S. Army from 1966 to 1968. Coats represented Indiana's 4th congressional district in the United States House of Representatives from 1981 to 1989. He was appointed to fill the Senate seat vacated by Dan Quayle following Quayle's election as Vice President of the United States. Coats won the 1990 special election to serve the remainder of Quayle's unexpired term, as well as the 1992 election for a full six-year term. He did not seek reelection in 1998 and was succeeded by Democrat Evan Bayh.

After retiring from the Senate, Coats served as U.S. ambassador to Germany from 2001 to 2005 and then worked as a lobbyist in Washington, D.C. He was reelected to the Senate by a large margin in 2010, succeeding Bayh, who announced his own retirement shortly after Coats declared his candidacy. Coats declined to run for reelection in 2016 and was succeeded by Todd Young. He was nominated as Director of National Intelligence in January 2017, succeeding James R. Clapper. His term in office commenced on March 16, 2017, and ended on August 15, 2019.

Early life and education
Coats was born in Jackson, Michigan, the son of Vera (Nora) Elisabeth (née Swanlund) and Edward Raymond Coats. His father was of English and German descent, and his maternal grandparents emigrated from Sweden. Coats attended local public schools, and graduated from Jackson High School in 1961. He then studied at Wheaton College in Wheaton, Illinois, where he earned a Bachelor of Arts degree in political science in 1965. At Wheaton, he was an active student athlete on the soccer team. Following his military service, Coats enrolled at the Indiana University School of Law – Indianapolis (now Indiana University Robert H. McKinney School of Law). Serving as associate editor of the Indiana Law Review, Coats completed his Juris Doctor in 1972.

Career 
He served in the United States Army Corps of Engineers from 1966 to 1968.  He also served as assistant vice president of a Fort Wayne life insurance company.

U.S. House of Representatives 

From 1976 to 1980, Coats worked for then-Congressman Dan Quayle, a Republican from Indiana's 4th congressional district, as Quayle's district representative. When Quayle decided to challenge three-term Democratic incumbent Birch Bayh in the 1980 U.S. Senate election, Coats ran for and won Quayle's seat in the U.S. House. He was reelected four times from this Fort Wayne-based district, usually without serious difficulty.

U.S. Senate 

When Quayle resigned from the Senate after being elected Vice President of the United States in 1988, Coats, who had just been elected to a fifth term in the House, was appointed to Quayle's former seat. He subsequently won a special election in 1990 for the balance of Quayle's second term, and was elected to a full term in 1992. Coats declined to run for a second full term in 1998. He served in the Senate until January 1999, at which time he was succeeded by Evan Bayh. Coats announced on February 3, 2010, he would run for his old Senate seat; and on February 16, 2010, Bayh announced his intention to retire. Coats went on to win the seat. In March 2015, he announced that he would not run for reelection in 2016. He served on the United States Senate Select Committee on Intelligence.

Between U.S. Senate tenures 

Coats worked as special counsel member in the firm Verner, Liipfert, Bernhard, McPherson and Hand in 2000 and 2001. In 2001, Coats was reportedly one of George W. Bush's top choices to be secretary of defense, a job eventually given to Donald Rumsfeld who had previously held the post under President Gerald Ford.

From August 15, 2001, to February 28, 2005, Coats was United States ambassador to Germany. As ambassador during the lead-up to the Iraq War, he unsuccessfully pressured the Government of Germany led by Chancellor Gerhard Schröder not to oppose the war, threatening worsened U.S. relations with Germany. As Ambassador he also played a critical role in establishing robust relations with then opposition leader Angela Merkel, who approved the Iraq war, and in the construction of a new United States Embassy in the heart of Berlin next to the Brandenburg Gate.

In 2005, Coats drew attention when he was chosen by President George W. Bush to shepherd Harriet Miers's failed nomination to the Supreme Court through the Senate. Echoing Senator Roman Hruska's famous 1970 speech in defense of Harrold Carswell, Coats said to CNN regarding the nomination: "If [being a] great intellectual powerhouse is a qualification to be a member of the court and represent the American people and the wishes of the American people and to interpret the Constitution, then I think we have a court so skewed on the intellectual side that we may not be getting representation of America as a whole."

In 2007, Coats served as co-chairman of a team of lobbyists for Cooper Industries, a Texas corporation that moved its principal place of business to Bermuda, where it would not be liable for U.S. taxes. In that role, he worked to block Senate legislation that would have closed a tax loophole, worth hundreds of millions of dollars to Cooper Industries.

Coats served as co-chairman of the Washington government relations office of King & Spalding.

Director of National Intelligence 

On January 5, 2017, Coats was announced as then-President-elect Donald Trump's nominee for the Cabinet-level position of Director of National Intelligence, to succeed the outgoing James R. Clapper. His confirmation hearing was held on February 28, 2017, to the United States Senate Intelligence Committee. On March 9, 2017, the United States Senate Intelligence Committee approved the nomination of Coats as National Intelligence Director with a 13–2 vote. The Senate confirmed his nomination with an 85–12 vote on March 15, 2017, and he was sworn into office on March 16.

On July 16, 2018, Coats released a statement affirming the consensus of the United States Intelligence Community (IC) that the Russian government interfered in the 2016 U.S. presidential election, a day after the 2018 Russia–United States summit where President Trump recanted his endorsement of the IC's assessment.

On September 6, 2018, Director Coats denied that he had authored the anonymous op-ed piece from a senior Trump Administration official that criticized the President which had been published by The New York Times the day prior. The day before, MSNBC host Lawrence O'Donnell speculated that Coats was the author of the guest essay, which was later revealed to have been written by then-United States Department of Homeland Security Chief of Staff Miles Taylor.

Coats released the DNI's "Worldwide Threat Assessment of the US Intelligence Community" on January 29, 2019, listing the major threats to the United States. The reports states that the "international system is coming under increasing strain amid continuing cyber and WMD proliferation threats, competition in space, and regional conflicts. Among the disturbing trends are hostile states and actors' intensifying online efforts to influence and interfere with elections here and abroad and their use of chemical weapons. Terrorism too will continue to be a top threat to US and partner interests worldwide, particularly in Sub-Saharan Africa, the Middle East, South Asia, and Southeast Asia. The development and application of new technologies will introduce both risks and opportunities, and the US economy will be challenged by slower global economic growth and growing threats to U.S. economic competitiveness." In the report, Coats also highlighted the potential negative impacts to US national security as a result of climate change, with this statement: "The United States will probably have to manage the impact of global human security challenges, such as threats to public health, historic levels of human displacement, assaults on religious freedom, and the
negative effects of environmental degradation and climate change."

Reporting to Congress in January 2019, the subject advised that Russia acting in concert with their allies will use novel strategies that build on their previous experience in election meddling. In July 2019, Coats appointed an election security "czar," Shelby Pierson, to oversee efforts across intelligence agencies. She is the first to have that role. Coats also directed other intelligence agencies to appoint executives to coordinate election security.

During his tenure Coats sometimes took public positions that conflicted with Trump's statements or actions. Areas of disagreement included Russia, and particularly Russia's interference in the 2016 election, as well as North Korea and Iran. On July 28, 2019, following multiple anonymous reports that he was about to be let go, Trump announced on Twitter that Coats would depart on August 15 and that he would nominate U.S. Representative John Ratcliffe (R-Texas) to replace him as Director of National Intelligence.

There has been speculation that Coats's firing as DNI was connected to the intelligence community's response to the Trump telephone conversation with Ukrainian President Volodymyr Zelenskyy on July 25, 2019. Coats's dismissal was three days later. This sequence of events was not understood at the time, because details of the call, which resulted in the impeachment inquiry against Trump, were not then yet public.

Political positions

Gun laws
On multiple occasions, Coats has supported gun control measures. In 1991, he voted in favor of the Biden-Thurmond Violent Crime Control Act of 1991. This act, which did not become law, would have created a waiting period for handgun purchases and placed a ban on assault weapons. Subsequently, he supported the Brady Handgun Violence Prevention Act that President Clinton signed into law in 1993. The legislation imposed a waiting period before a handgun could be transferred to an individual by a licensed dealer, importer, or manufacturer. This waiting period ended when the computerized instant check system came online. Coats also supported Feinstein Amendment 1152 to the Violent Crime Control and Law Enforcement Act of 1993. The purpose of the Feinstein Amendment was to "restrict the manufacture, transfer, and possession of certain semiautomatic assault weapons and large capacity ammunition feeding devices".

In April 2013, Coats was one of forty-six senators to vote against passage of a bill which would have expanded background checks for gun buyers. Coats voted with 40 Republicans and five Democrats to stop the passage of the bill.

Taxes
In 1995, Coats introduced S. 568: Family, Investment, Retirement, Savings, and Tax Fairness Act which would provide "family tax credits, increase national savings through individual retirement plus accounts, indexing for inflation the income thresholds for taxing social security benefits, etc". The bill did not become law.

LGBT issues
In 1993, Coats emerged as an opponent of President Clinton's effort to allow LGBT individuals to serve openly in the armed forces. Coats was one of the authors of the Don't Ask, Don't Tell policy and opposed its 2011 repeal. He does not support same-sex marriage but opposes interference with "alternative lifestyles".

Russia
Coats pressed President Barack Obama to punish Russia harshly for its March 2014 annexation of Crimea. For this stance, the Russian government banned Coats and several other U.S. lawmakers from traveling to Russia.

In January 2019, Coats warned against the alliance between Russia and China.

Iran and Iraq

Coats supported the 2003 invasion of Iraq on the grounds of uncovering what he believed to be 
Iraq's weapons of mass destruction.

Coats opposed the 2015 nuclear deal between Iran and six world powers – the U.S., U.K., Russia, France, China, and Germany. He described Iran as the foremost "state sponsor of terrorism".

During testimony before the Senate Intelligence Committee in January 2019, Coats said that Iran "continues to sponsor terrorism". According to Coats, "Iran's regional ambitions and improved military capabilities almost certainly will threaten US interests in the coming year."

Palestine
Coats co-sponsored the Taylor Force Act. The legislation proposes to stop American economic aid to the Palestinian Authority unless it stops payments to individuals who commit acts of terrorism and to the families of deceased terrorists.

In September 2016, in advance of a UN Security Council resolution 2334 condemning Israeli settlements in the occupied Palestinian territories, Coats signed an AIPAC-sponsored letter urging President Barack Obama to veto "one-sided" resolutions against Israel.

Other

Coats co-sponsored, with former senators Edward M. Kennedy, Christopher Dodd, and James Jeffords, S.2206: Coats Human Services Reauthorization Act of 1998. This bill, which was enacted into law, "amended the Head Start Act, the Low-Income Home Energy Assistance Act of 1981, and the Community Services Block Grant Act... in order to provide an opportunity for persons with limited means to accumulate assets."

In 1996, Coats co-sponsored the Line Item Veto Act of 1996, which President Clinton signed into law. The bill allowed the President to "rewrit[e] legislation by vetoing single items of spending or specific tax breaks approved by Congress." In June 1998, The Supreme Court of the United States declared the law unconstitutional in Clinton v. City of New York in a 6–3 decision.

Coats made headlines in August 1998, when he publicly questioned the timing of President Bill Clinton's cruise missile attacks on Afghanistan and Sudan, suggesting they might be linked to the Lewinsky scandal: "While there is clearly much more we need to learn about this attack and why it was ordered today, given the president's personal difficulties this week, it is legitimate to question the timing of this action."

Political campaigns

2010 

On February 10, 2010, Coats confirmed that he would return to Indiana to run for the seat held by incumbent Evan Bayh in the 2010 United States Senate election. Bayh had made no previous announcements and was fully expected to run for another term, but after Coats announced his candidacy, Bayh announced his retirement on February 15, 2010. On May 4, 2010, Coats won the Republican primary over State Senator Marlin Stutzman and former U.S. Representative John Hostettler.

Coats defeated Democratic U.S. Representative Brad Ellsworth by a 15-point margin to return to the Senate.

Coats became the senior senator from Indiana after Richard Lugar lost a challenge in the 2012 Republican primary election and subsequently was not re-elected to the Senate in 2012. Coats served the remainder of his term with Democrat Joe Donnelly.

Electoral history

Personal life
He is married to Marsha Coats, Indiana's woman representative to the Republican National Committee.

He received the Big Brothers Big Sisters of America's Charles G. Berwind Lifetime Achievement Award in 2012.

In 2015, Coats received the Benjamin Harrison Presidential Site Advancing American Democracy Award.

Coats is described as a "die-hard Chicago Cubs fan". He and Marsha Coats went to a Cubs game the day after their wedding.

See also
Electoral history of Dan Coats

Notes

References

External links

 Director of National Intelligence Dan Coats

Vice President Pence Participates in a Swearing-in Ceremony for Director of National Intelligence Dan Coats, March 16, 2017, White House

|-

|-

|-

|-

|-

|-

|-

|-

|-

1943 births
Living people
21st-century American politicians
Ambassadors of the United States to Germany
American lobbyists
American people of English descent
American people of German descent
American people of Swedish descent
American Presbyterians
Indiana lawyers
Indiana University Robert H. McKinney School of Law alumni
Military personnel from Michigan
Politicians from Jackson, Michigan
Republican Party United States senators from Indiana
Trump administration cabinet members
United States Army non-commissioned officers
United States congressional aides
United States Directors of National Intelligence
Wheaton College (Illinois) alumni
21st-century American diplomats
Republican Party members of the United States House of Representatives from Indiana